Melancholy (Persian: مالیخولیا ) is a 2016 Iranian drama film directed, produced and co-written by Morteza Atashzamzam. The other writers are Majid Shakrin and Hossein Mortezaeian Abkenar. The film stars Leila Otadi, Mohammad Reza Hedayati and Laleh Eskandari. According to the director, Melancholy is not about what is real or not, but it is about the threshold between what is real and what is illusion, which varies according to the character's point of view.

Plot
After a long time, and medical problems, Mina finally becomes pregnant. However, she feels ignored by Hesam, her husband. Indeed, he is more concerned about the personal and family problems of his colleague Shirin, who has recently divorced from her husband.

Cast 
 Leila Otadi
 Mohammad-Reza Hedayati
 Laleh Eskandari
 Nader Fallah
 Mohammad Fiali

References

2010s Persian-language films
2016 films
2016 drama films
Iranian drama films